La Mesa    is a corregimiento in La Mesa District, Veraguas Province, Panama with a population of 3,338 as of 2010. It is the seat of La Mesa District. Its population as of 1990 was 4,425; its population as of 2000 was 4,513.

References

Corregimientos of Veraguas Province